Zawr al-Qaadah is a Syrian village located in the Mahardah Subdistrict of the Mahardah District in Hama Governorate. According to the Syria Central Bureau of Statistics (CBS), Zawr al-Qaadah had a population of 2,064 in the 2004 census.

References 

Populated places in Mahardah District